The 2004 United States House of Representatives election in South Dakota took place on Tuesday, November 2, 2004. Voters selected a representative for their single At-Large district, who ran on a statewide ballot.

In the regularly scheduled election in November 2004, freshman incumbent Stephanie Herseth and state Senator Larry Diedrich, who had run in the July 2004 special election earlier, faced each other in a rematch; Libertarian candidate Terry L. Begay also ran in this election.

Herseth again prevailed, this time by a wider margin of 53% to 46% despite President George W. Bush's dominant 59.9% to 38.4% over Senator John Kerry in South Dakota in the 2004 presidential election.

References

United States House of Representatives
South Dakota
2004